Apolychrosis is a genus of moths belonging to the family Tortricidae.

Species
Apolychrosis ambogonium  Pogue, in Cibrian-Tovar et al., 1986
Apolychrosis candidus  Pogue, in Cibrian-Tovar et al., 1986
Apolychrosis ferruginus  Pogue, in Cibrian-Tovar et al., 1986
Apolychrosis schwerdtfegeri  Amsel, 1962
Apolychrosis synchysis  Pogue, in Cibrian-Tovar et al., 1986

References

 , 1962, Z. angew. Ent. 49: 395.
 , 2005, World Catalogue of Insects 5

External links
tortricidae.com

Euliini
Tortricidae genera